Mabellina is a genus of jumping spiders only found in Panama. It contains only one species, Mabellina prescotti.

References

  (2007): The world spider catalog, version 8.0. American Museum of Natural History.

External links

 Picture of M. prescotti

Monotypic Salticidae genera
Fauna of Panama
Salticidae
Spiders of Central America